Eilean Kearstay is an uninhabited island in Loch Roag in the Outer Hebrides of Scotland.

It lies south east of Great Bernera, just across the water from the headland of Callanish.

In 1990 the island was sold by Prince Robin de la Lanne-Mirrlees to an Australian. It was sold to new owners three years later.

Notes and references

Islands of Loch Ròg
Uninhabited islands of the Outer Hebrides